XHMET-FM is a radio station in Temozon, Yucatán. Broadcasting on 91.9 FM, XHMET is owned by Grupo Rivas and carries a grupera format known as La Reverenda, simulcast from XHMRI-FM 93.7 in Mérida.

History
XHMET began as XEME-AM 1490, with a concession awarded in 1972 to Manuel Rodríguez Escoffie. The original concession specified Valladolid as the location of the new AM station. The station later moved to 570 kHz as a daytimer, operating with 2.5 kilowatts of power.

In 2006, the station moved its transmitter to Temozon, nine miles further down the Valladolid-Tizimín highway. In 2010, it received authorization to move to FM. As there was already an XHME-FM in Puerto Vallarta, Jalisco, the station became XHMET-FM 91.9.

References

Radio stations in Yucatán
Radio stations established in 1972